Ricardo Williams may refer to:

Ricardo Williams (boxer) (born 1981), American boxer
Ricardo Williams (cricketer) (born 1968), English cricketer
Ricardo Williams (athlete) (born 1976), Jamaican Olympic athlete
Ricky Williams (The Young and the Restless), a character from the American soap opera, The Young and the Restless

See also
Ricky Williams (disambiguation)
Richard Williams (disambiguation)